The Sterling Chase, also known as Graduation Week, is a drama film written and directed by Tanya Fenmore and starring Nicholle Tom, Jack Noseworthy, Devon Odessa, Sean Patrick Thomas, Alanna Ubach and John Livingston. The independent film was screened at the Mill Valley Film Festival on September 17, 1999 (see 1999 in film).  Screen story was written by Jeremy Dauber, currently an assistant professor at Columbia University.  Filming took place on the campuses of Bryn Mawr College and Rosemont College, namely in the Main Building, or Joseph Sinnott Mansion.

Cast
 Andrea Ferrell as Melissa
 John Livingston as Matt 'Bunz' Bernstein
 Irene Ng as Cathy
 Sean Patrick Thomas as Darren
 Jack Noseworthy as Todd
 Devon Odessa as Chris
 Nicholle Tom as Alesis
 Alanna Ubach as Jenna Marino
 Tony Devon as Mr. Marino

References

External links

1999 films
1999 drama films
1990s English-language films